Säfström is a Swedish surname. Notable people with the surname include:

Eleonora Säfström (1770–1857), Swedish actress
Erik Säfström (born 1988), Swedish bandy player
Orvar Säfström (born 1974), Swedish film critic and video game journalist

Swedish-language surnames